The American cooking television series Secrets of a Restaurant Chef aired on Food Network from 2008 to 2012. A total of 119 episodes of the series aired over nine seasons.

Episodes

Season 1 (2008)

Season 2 (2008–2009)

Season 3 (2009)

Season 4 (2009–2010)

Season 5 (2010)

Season 6 (2010)

Season 7 (2011)

Season 8 (2011)

Season 9 (2012)

Notes

References

External links
 
 

Lists of American non-fiction television series episodes
Lists of food television series episodes